The Powder Tower is situated in Riga, Latvia, and originally a part of the defensive system of the town. The current Powder Tower was built in 1650 and renovated in the years 1937 to 1940 when it was added to the structure of the Latvian War Museum.

History 
The tower was first mentioned in 1330 as the Sand Tower (the name apparently derives from the sand hills opposite the tower). During the Swedish attack on Poland of 1621, the entire tower was destroyed, except the basement, on which the now visible Powder Tower was built in 1650. The name of the powder tower dates back to the 17th century when apparently gunpowder was stored in it. There were 11 cannons in the tower, and a "bomb catcher" was installed: between the fifth and sixth floors, a meter-thick ceiling of three layers of oak and pine logs was laid. Later in the tower was a prison, and torture chambers, weapons were stored until 1883. In the walls of the tower can be seen cannonballs, which were placed in commemoration of the Second Northern War.

Gallery

References

Powder Tower
Riga
Towers completed in 1650
Towers in Riga
Towers completed in 1940